Allen John George Sheppard, Baron Sheppard of Didgemere,  (25 December 1932 – 25 March 2015) was a British industrialist and Conservative member of the House of Lords.

He was educated at Ilford County High School and the London School of Economics. He worked first in car manufacturing: Ford of Britain and Ford of Europe, 1958–68; Rootes/Chrysler, 1968–71; British Leyland, 1971–75. He then moved to Grand Metropolitan, 1975–96, being Chief Executive, 1986–93 and Chairman, 1987–96.

From 1996 to 2003, he was non-executive chairman of GB Railways Group Plc, a train company listed on the Alternative Investment Market which operated the Anglia Railways franchise, and which launched GB Railfreight and Hull Trains.

He was chairman of the Board of Trustees, Prince's Youth Business Trust, 1990–94 and of the Prince's Trust Council, 1995–98. He was a member of the Board of Management of the Conservative Party, 1993–98. He was a governor of LSE since 1989 and was Chancellor, Middlesex University 2000–13.

He received a knighthood in 1990 Birthday Honours, having the accolade conferred by The Queen on 4 December 1990. He was created a life peer as Baron Sheppard of Didgemere, of Roydon in the County of Essex on 6 September 1994, and was appointed a Knight Commander of the Royal Victorian Order (KCVO) in the 1998 New Year Honours.

References

 Who's Who 2011

External links
 Lord Sheppard of Didgemere at Parliament of the United Kingdom website

1932 births
2015 deaths
People educated at Ilford County High School
Sheppard of Didgemere
Knights Commander of the Royal Victorian Order
Alumni of the London School of Economics
People associated with Middlesex University
Knights Bachelor
Governors of the London School of Economics
Life peers created by Elizabeth II